Melicope ternata, commonly known as wharangi, is a coastal shrub or small tree in the family Rutaceae that is native to New Zealand.

Melicope ternata has glossy, green, trifoliate foliage and can grow into a tree 6 metres tall. It is found in coastal areas in the main islands of New Zealand and the North, South, Three Kings and Kermadec islands.

References
 

ternata
Endemic flora of New Zealand
Trees of New Zealand